Antoine Carré (born 4 March 1943 in Fleury-les-Aubrais) was a member of the National Assembly of France. He represented Loiret's 1st constituency, and is a member of the Union for a Popular Movement.

References

1943 births
Living people
People from Loiret
Republican Party (France) politicians
Liberal Democracy (France) politicians
Union for French Democracy politicians
Union for a Popular Movement politicians
Deputies of the 8th National Assembly of the French Fifth Republic
Deputies of the 10th National Assembly of the French Fifth Republic
Deputies of the 11th National Assembly of the French Fifth Republic
Deputies of the 12th National Assembly of the French Fifth Republic
Mayors of places in Centre-Val de Loire

Members of Parliament for Loiret